A glee club in the United States is a musical group or choir group, historically of male voices but also of female or mixed voices, which traditionally specializes in the singing of short songs by trios or quartets. In the late 19th century it was very popular in most schools and was made a tradition to have in American high schools from then on. 

Glee clubs were named after a form of English part song, called a glee, which they typically sang. The first named Glee Club held its initial meeting in the Newcastle Coffee House in London in 1787.  Glee clubs were very popular in Britain from then until the mid-1850s but by then they were gradually being superseded by larger choral societies.  But by the mid-20th century, proper glee clubs were no longer common.

Testifying to the importance of glee clubs in 19th Century America, Henry Stone, a Union veteran of the American Civil War, recalled that "A glee club came down from Chicago, bringing with them the new song, "We'll rally 'round the flag, boys" (Battle Cry of Freedom), and it ran through the camp like wildfire. The effect was little short of miraculous. It put as much spirit and cheer into the army as a victory."

The term remains in contemporary use, for choirs established in North American colleges, universities, and high schools, although most American glee clubs are choruses in the standard sense, and rarely perform glees.

Oldest United States collegiate glee clubs

The oldest collegiate glee clubs in the United States are, by year of foundation:
 1858: Harvard Glee Club
 1859: University of Michigan Men's Glee Club
 1861: Yale Glee Club
 1862: Wesleyan University Glee Club
 1862: The University of Pennsylvania Glee Club
 1865: Amherst College Glee Club
 1868: Cornell University Glee Club
 1869: Union College Men's Glee Club
 1869: Lehigh University Glee Club
 1871: Virginia Glee Club
 1872: Rutgers University Glee Club
 1873: Columbia University Glee Club
 1874: Princeton Glee Club
 1874: Worcester Polytechnic Institute Men's Glee Club
 1875: The Ohio State University Men's Glee Club
 1877: The Mount Holyoke College Glee Club
 1886: The University of Illinois Varsity Men's Glee Club
 1888: Penn State Glee Club
 1890: Pitt Men's Glee Club
 1890: The University of Kansas Men's Glee Club
 1892: The Pomona College Men's Glee Club 
 1892: Wabash College Glee Club

 1893: University of Michigan Women’s Glee Club
 1893: Purdue Varsity Glee Club
 1893: Texas A&M Singing Cadets
1897: Case Men's Glee Club (Case Institute of Technology and Western Reserve University)
1901: The University of Oklahoma Men's Glee Club
1902: The Pomona College Women's Glee Club 
1903: West Point Glee Club
 1906: Georgia Tech Glee Club
 1907: Wheaton College Men's Glee Club, Miami University Glee Club
 1911: Morehouse College Glee Club

1915: University of Notre Dame Glee Club
1916: Tiger Glee Club (Louisiana State University)
1927: University of Pittsburgh Women's Choral Ensemble 

The oldest non-collegiate glee club in the United States is the Mendelssohn Glee Club, founded in 1866.

See also
Glee (TV series)
List of collegiate glee clubs

References

Further reading
J. Lloyd Winstead (2013) When Colleges Sang: The Story of Singing in American College Life  University of Alabama Press 

Glee clubs
Types of musical groups
Student organizations